Salín is a mountain at the border of Argentina and Chile with an elevation of  metres. Salin is within the following mountain ranges: Argentine Andes, Chilean Andes, Puna de Atacama. Its territory is within the Argentinean protection area of Provincial Fauna Reserve Los Andes. It is on the border of 3 provinces: Argentinean province of Salta; Chilean provinces of El Loa and Antofagasta. Its slopes are within 3 cities: Argentinean city of Tolar Grande, Chilean cities of San Pedro de Atacama and Antofagasta (Chile).

Elevation 
Other data from available digital elevation models: SRTM yields 6024 metres, ASTER 6008 metres and TanDEM-X 6066 metres. The height of the nearest key col is 4546 meters, leading to a topographic prominence of 1494 meters. Salin is considered a Mountain Range according to the Dominance System and its dominance is 24.74%. Its parent peak is Pular and the Topographic isolation is 14.2 kilometers.

First Ascent 
Salin was first climbed by Sergio Bossini and Carlos Mas (Argentina) in October 5 th 1960.

See also
List of mountains in the Andes

External links 

 Elevation information about Salin
 Weather Forecast at Salin

References

Mountains of Argentina
Six-thousanders of the Andes